T2, T-2, T2, T2 may refer to:

Computing
 Apple T2, a SoC from Apple for security and hardware management within Intel based Macs
 Palm Tungsten T2, a Palm OS-based personal digital assistant
 T2 or T-2, a 6.312 Mbit/s T-carrier in telecommunications
 T2, a German keyboard layout
 T2 Temporal Prover, an automated program analyzer by Microsoft Research
 UltraSPARC T2, a Sun Microsystem microprocessor
 T2 SDE, a Linux distribution kit

Medicine and physiology
 T-2 mycotoxin, a type of trichothecene mycotoxin, a naturally occurring mold byproduct of certain species of Fusarium fungi
 T2 or diiodothyronine, a metabolite of thyroid hormone
 T2 hyperintensity, an area of high intensity on types of MRI scans of the brain that reflect lesions produced largely by demyelination and axonal loss
 T2, the second highest (closest to the neck) of the thoracic vertebrae, the bones of the spine of the upper back
 T2, the thoracic spinal nerve 2
 T2, a small-to-moderate size cancerous tumor in the TNM staging system

Entertainment

Books
 T2 (novel series), a literary trilogy that continues after Terminator 2: Judgment Day

Films
 T2 (2009 film), a 2009 Filipino film
 T2 Trainspotting, a 2017 sequel to Trainspotting
 Terminator 2: Judgment Day, a 1991 science fiction film

Games
 Tak 2: The Staff of Dreams, a 2004 video game
 Take-Two Interactive, American multinational publisher distributor of video games
 Tekken 2, a 1995 fighting game
 Thief II: The Metal Age, a 2000 video game
 Tribes 2, a 2001 video game
 Tsquared (born 1987), American e-sports gamer
 Turok 2: Seeds of Evil, a 1998 video game

Music
 T2 (band), a British progressive rock band
 T2 (producer), British producer most notable for the track "Heartbroken", which reached No. 2 in the UK Singles Chart

Sport
 Portland Timbers 2, an American soccer club in the United Soccer League
T2 (classification), a para-cycling classification
 Terrell Thomas (born 1985), American football player who plays for the New York Giants

Science and specifications
 T-mount, a Tamron lens thread specification
 T-2, the second Jupiter Trojan survey, a subproject of the Palomar–Leiden survey
 T2, a fluorescent tube diameter designation
 T2, a mathematical concept used in topology, see Hausdorff space
 T2 or spin-spin relaxation time, a time constant in radiology
 T2, a temperature classification, also referred to as a T-code, on electrical equipment labeled for hazardous locations
 T2 (Torx size), a six-sided screw, bolt or driver size
 T2 or Treadmill 2, on board the International Space Station

Transport

Air
 ACAZ T.2, a Belgian monoplane designed in 1924
Antonov T-2M Maverick, ultralight trike aircraft
Fokker F.IV, aircraft designated T-2 when used by the United States Army Air Service
Mitsubishi T-2, a 1971 Japanese jet trainer aircraft 
T-2 Buckeye (aircraft)
Thai Air Cargo, IATA airline designator

Rail
 Inner West & Leppington Line, a rail service in Sydney numbered T2
 Paris Tramway Line 2
 Tatra T2, a 1955 Czechoslovakian tramcar
 T2, a model of the OS T1000 train of the Oslo Metro

Road
 Estonian national road 2, officially T2, connecting Tallinn, Tartu, Võru and Luhamaa
T2 Road (Zambia), a road in Zambia
Great North Road, Zambia

Other
 Ford T2 platform
 Soyuz T-2, a 1980 Soviet mission to the Salyut 6 space station.
 Heathrow Terminal 2
 T2, a type of transit lane in Australia
 T2 tank, a tank prototype that evolved into the M2 light tank
 T2 tank recovery vehicle, another name for the M31 variant of the M3 Lee tank
 T2 tanker, a mass-produced tanker used during and after World War II
 Volkswagen Type 2, Volkswagen car model
 Mercedes-Benz T2, a light commercial vehicle manufactured by Daimler-Benz

Other uses
 T2 (Australian company), Australian retail chain of tea stores
 T2, a bedside television unit used by Hospedia
 T2 or T2 Corporation Income Tax Return, a corporate tax form in Canada
 T-2 (ISP), an Internet Service Provider in Slovenia
 T2, the nickname for the now defunct weekday supplement, times2, in The Times of London
 T2 (roller coaster), a roller coaster at Six Flags Kentucky Kingdom
 T-2, a second partial float of the formerly government-owned Telstra telecommunications provider in Australia
 T+2, "trade date plus two days" in financial markets

See also
2T (disambiguation)
TT (disambiguation)
T-square (disambiguation), including T-squared
 A tornado intensity rating on the TORRO scale